Syrup of figs is a formerly proprietary preparation for use as a laxative, now widely available commercially and also easy to make at home. Its ingredients include figs and dried senna pods, both known for their laxative properties, as well as water, sugar and lemon. The syrup was invented in 1879 by Richard E. Queen and immediately sold to the California Fig Syrup Company of Reno, Nevada, which manufactured and marketed it thereafter.

The product was the subject of a lawsuit, Clinton Worden Company v. California Fig Syrup Company, which was decided in favor of the syrup company by the Supreme Court of the United States in 1905.

In popular culture 
 In episode 2, season 1 of the TV series Blandings (2013), syrup of figs is used for revenge.
 In Agatha Christie's 1936 novel Cards on the Table, a woman dies after mistaking poison for syrup of figs.
 In episode 7, season 1 of Downton Abbey, Daisy the scullery maid almost taints the servants dinner of beef stew with syrup of figs, moving Thomas the footman to remark, "at least we'd be regular".

References

External links 
 California Fig Syrup: The Company and Its Bottles

Laxatives